Amala (ml; അമല) is an Indian television series which launched on Mazhavil Manorama channel.  Varada plays the role of the protagonist of the series. The final episode was telecast on 30 January 2015. It aired on Monday to Friday at 8:00 P.M. It is broadcast on the channel since March 2017 at 5:30 P.M.

Amala told the story of a pure hearted girl named Amala who faces many problems life. The serial became popular in Malayalee households.

Cast 

 Varada as Amala Narendran (Ammu) - Main Female lead
 KPAC Saji as Narendran Thambi, Amala's Husband (Male Lead)
Sajan Surya as Arjunan - Parallel Male lead
 Jishin Mohan as Hareesh - Main Antagonist
 Kumarakam Raghunath as Vijayakrishnan
 Beena Antony as Sudharma Vijayakrishnan
 Maneesh Krishna as Sudeesh, Neeraja's Husband
 Angel Mariya as Neeraja Vijayakrishnan
 Bindhu Ramakrishnan as Mutashi, Vijayakrishnan's Mother
 Jayan
 Subhash Nair as Jayan - Antagonist
 Sabarinath as Devan - Antagonist
 M. B. Padmakumar as Narendran Thampi's henchmen
 Adithyan Jayan
 Manju Satheesh as Vineetha, Vijayakrishnan's sister
 Anila Sreekumar as Gayathri, Vijayakrishnan's sister
 Kezia Joseph/Neethu Thomas as Mahima Vijayakrishnan
 Karthika Kannan
 M. R. Gopakumar as Achutha Kuruppu
 Geetha Salam
 Meghna Vincent as Nayana
 Pratheeksha G Pradeep
 Sreedevi Anil
 Manu Nair
 Ambareesh
 Parvathy Raveendran
 Sumi Santhosh
 Maneesh Krishnan
 Yamuna Mahesh
 Alis Christy
 Anushree
 Prabha
 Chaya Govind
 Ambika Mohan as Radhamani, Amala's Mother
 Rukmini
 Parvathy
 Kalady Omana

References 

2013 Indian television series debuts
Malayalam-language television shows
Mazhavil Manorama original programming